Morad Jan (also Romanized as Morād Jān; also known as Marājān, Marjān, and Morādjān-e Chovārī) is a village in Nurali Rural District, in the Central District of Delfan County, Lorestan Province, Iran. At the 2006 census, its population was 739, in 159 families.

References 

Towns and villages in Delfan County